Raynaldo Sturrup (born 11 January 1990) is a Bahamian international footballer who played college soccer for Thomas University, as a goalkeeper.

Career
Sturrup has played college soccer in the United States for Thomas University.

He made his international debut for Bahamas in 2011, and has appeared in FIFA World Cup qualifying matches.

References

1990 births
Living people
Sportspeople from Nassau, Bahamas
Association football goalkeepers
Bahamian footballers
Bahamas international footballers
College men's soccer players in the United States
Thomas University alumni
Bahamas under-20 international footballers
Bahamas youth international footballers